Deal Raja is a 2016 Indian Kannada-language comedy film written and directed by Rajgopi. The Movie  stars Komal Kumar, Bhanu Sri Mehra and Ithi Acharya. The music is composed by Abhimann Roy and cinematography is by Jai Anand.

The trailer of the film received positive hype on social media networks. The film was released on 29 July 2016. This film brought a very good director to the industry. It is the second venture for Rajgopi. He proved himself as a pakka commercial director. He has his own style of scripting and a good hold on narrating the story.

Cast

 Komal Kumar as Deal Raja
 Bhanu Sri Mehra 
 Ithi Acharya
 Suman Ranganathan
 Bullet Prakash
 Sadhu Kokila
 Tabla Nani 
 Jai Jagadish
 Mithra
 Kuri Prathap
 Suchendra Prasad
 Ramakrishna
 Bose Venkat

Soundtrack

Abhimann Roy has composed the film's background score and the soundtrack.

Track listing

References

2016 films
Indian comedy films
Films shot in Sri Lanka
2010s Kannada-language films
2016 comedy films

Films scored by Abhimann Roy

External Links